Beat Aebi (born 17 April 1966) is a Swiss former footballer who played in the late 1980s and early 1990s. He played mainly as a forward, but also as a midfielder. 

Aebi first played for local club FC Volketswil. FC Basel had been relegated after the 1988–89 Nationalliga A season and because many players left their squad, they were hiring new players. Aebi thus joined Basel for their 1988–89 season under head coach Urs Siegenthaler. After playing in seven test games Aebi made his domestic league debut for his new club in the home game at the Stadion Schützenmatte on 27 July 1988 against Locarno. Aebi scored his first goal for his club during the same game as Basel won 3–0.

He stayed with the club for two seasons and during this time played 46 games and scored four goals; 26 games were in the Nationalliga A, 5 in the Swiss Cup and 15 were friendly games. He scored three goals in the domestic league, the other during the cup match on 20 August 1988 against local club FC Oberwil.

After his time in Basel, Aebi returned home to Volketswil and he later coached a number of local clubs and was trainer to FC Volketswil's first team.

References

Sources
 Die ersten 125 Jahre. Publisher: Josef Zindel im Friedrich Reinhardt Verlag, Basel. 
 Verein "Basler Fussballarchiv" Homepage

FC Basel players
Swiss men's footballers
Association football midfielders
Association football forwards
1966 births
Living people